La Punta is a district of the Constitutional Province of Callao in Peru, and one of the seven districts that make up the port city of Callao. 
It is located in a peninsula in the western part of the province and is almost entirely surrounded by the Pacific Ocean, except on its northeastern side, where it is bordered by downtown Callao.

Officially established as a district on October 6, 1915, the current mayor (alcalde) of La Punta is Pio Salazar (2019-2022).

Geography
The district has a total land area of 0.38 km². Its administrative center is located 2 meters above sea level.

Boundaries
 North, East, South and West: Pacific Ocean
 Northeast: Downtown Callao

Demographics
According to a 2002 estimate by the INEI, the district has 7,246 inhabitants and a population density of 394.2 persons/km². In 1999, there were 1,248 households in the district.

La Punta has historically been settled by Italian Peruvians and their legacy can still be seen in the district.

The district

La Punta is mostly an upper middle class district, where Callao's most prestigious families have historically lived. Many of the district's old houses are still conserved.

La Punta has an earthquake alarm system which alerts the residents to evacuate the district, since one strong enough could create a tsunami and easily wipe out the peninsula.

La Punta is also one of the districts in which beaches are affected by the ocean current El Niño annually.

Almost one third of La Punta's territory is occupied by the Escuela Naval del Peru ("Peruvian Naval Academy").

The Club Regatas Unión is located in the upscale beach front of La Punta. The district has three beaches: "Cantolao", "Malecón" and "La Arenilla". La Punta Racing Club is another club located in la Punta.

The chamber of Commerce of La Punta has been recently created to promote tourist projects and to create the guild of traders, as well as cultural programs and workshops in the district.

The main routes that connect La Punta with the rest of the Lima and Callao Metropolitan Area are the Avenida Almirante Grau and Coronel Bolognesi Avenues.

The San Lorenzo and El Frontón islands lie in front of La Punta and can clearly be seen from the district's beaches.

La Punta is a small district compared with others but has a unique beauty. Because of its geography and intense crime prevention program the district is virtually crime free and clean. Buildings range from the very modern all the way back to 19th century manors.

Beaches
The beaches in La Punta are quite visited during the summer season because of their calm waters and small pebbles composition (in contrast to Costa Verde in Lima where the surf is stronger and the beaches are mainly stone), nevertheless La Punta is well known for their surprisingly frigid waters (Cantolao beach).
This calm sea favours the practice of rowing and yachting. La Punta is the one district were most regattas are launched. Yacht Club del Peru has its main venue in La Punta in the beautiful Aspillaga House. There are four rowing clubs in La Punta: Club Universitario de Regatas, Club Regatas Union, Canottieri Italia, Club de Regatas Lima. Also the Naval Academy has a rowing team and there are a few clubs that also practice there intermittently. There is heavy traffic of racing shells in the mornings. The bay is also full of recreational crafts of all sizes.

External links
 Municipalidad Distrital de La Punta - District council official website (in Spanish)
 Todo Callao (in Spanish)
 Chim Pum Callao - Pictures of La Punta

Districts of the Callao Region